The Robert Award for Best Actor in a Supporting Role is one of the merit awards presented by the Danish Film Academy at the annual Robert Awards ceremony. The award has been handed out since 1984.

Honorees

1980s 
 1984:  for 
 1985: Bent Mejding for Twist and Shout
 1986: Flemming Bamse Jørgensen for 
 1987:  for 
 1988: Björn Granath for Pelle the Conqueror
 1989: Erik Mørk for

1990s 
 1990:  for 
 1991:  for 
 1992: Nikolaj Lie Kaas for The Boys from St. Petri
 1993: Jesper Christensen for Sofie
 1994: Jesper Christensen for Den russiske sangerinde
 1995: Kim Bodnia for Nightwatch
 1996: Søren Pilmark for 
 1997: Ulrich Thomsen for The Biggest Heroes
 1998: Jesper Christensen for Barbara
 1999: Thomas Bo Larsen for The Celebration

2000s 
 2000: Jesper Asholt for Mifune
 2001: Peter Gantzler for Italiensk for begyndere
 2002: Troels Lyby for En kort en lang
 2003: Nikolaj Lie Kaas for Elsker dig for evigt
 2004: Peter Steen for The Inheritance
 2005: Søren Pilmark for King's Game
 2006: Thure Lindhardt for Nordkraft
 2007: Bent Mejding for Drømmen
 2008: Jesper Asholt for The Art of Crying
 2009: Jens Jørn Spottag for To verdener

2010s 
 2010: Henning Moritzen for Headhunter
 2011: Peter Plaugborg for Submarino
 2012: Lars Ranthe for Dirch
 2013: Mikkel Boe Følsgaard for En kongelig affære
 2014: Nicolas Bro for 
 2015: Fares Fares for The Absent One
 2016: Nicolas Bro for Mænd og Høns
 2017: Lars Mikkelsen for Der kommer en dag
 2018: Jakob Oftebro for 
 2019: Fares Fares for

2020s 
 2020: Magnus Krepper for Dronningen
 2021: Lars Brygmann for Riders of Justice

See also 

 Bodil Award for Best Actor in a Supporting Role

References

External links 
  

1984 establishments in Denmark
Awards established in 1984
Film awards for supporting actor
Actor in a Supporting Role